Moro may refer to:

Events 
 Moro Crater massacre (1906), an engagement in the Philippine–American War
 Moro River Campaign (1943), a World War II campaign between Allied and German forces on the Moro river and its headwaters in Italy
 Moro insurgency in the Philippines (1969–2014), an ethnoreligious conflict in the Philippines between the predominantly-Catholic government and Muslim separatists

Ethnic groups 

 Moro people, a mostly Muslim people of southern Philippines
 Moors, the English variation of the Spanish term moro referring to Muslim inhabitants of the Iberian Peninsula and North Africa during the Middle Ages
 Sri Lankan Moors or Ceylon Moors, an ethnic group
 Indian Moors, an ethnic group
 Moro people, also known as the Ayoreo people, an indigenous people of Bolivia and Paraguay
 Moro Nuba people, a subgroup of the Nuba people in southern Sudan
 Moru people, an ethnic group in South Sudan
 Moroccans, shortened form or slang referring to people from Morocco, sometimes used among immigrant communities

Languages 
 Moro, an alternative name for the Ayoreo language, spoken in Peru and Bolivia
 Moro language (Nigeria), an East Kainji language spoken in Nigeria
 Moro language, a Kordofanian language spoken in southern Sudan by the Moro Nuba people
 Moru language, spoken in South Sudan by the Moru people

Places

Africa 
 Moro, Kwara, a Local Government Area in Kwara State
Moro River (Mano River), a tributary of the Mano River in Sierra Leone and Liberia; see List of rivers of Sierra Leone

Asia 
 Moro Station, Japanese railway station
 Moro, Pakistan, a city in Sindh province
 Moro Province, a former province of the Philippines

Europe 
 Moro (Italian river), a river in Italy
 Moro (Ribadesella), a parish of Ribadesella, Asturias, Spain
 Móró, the Hungarian name for Morău village, Cornești, Cluj, Romania

North America 
 Moro, former name of Taft, California
 Moro, Oregon, the county seat of Sherman County, Oregon
 Moro Township, Madison County, Illinois, a township in Madison County, Illinois
 Moro, Illinois, an unincorporated community in Madison County, Illinois
 Moro Plantation, a plantation in Aroostook County, Maine

Other uses 
 Moro (chocolate bar), a brand of chocolate bar made by Cadbury
 Moro (surname), a surname
 Moro Movement, a social, political, and economic movement in the Solomon Islands
 Moro, a camouflage pattern formerly used by several Polish military formations
 Moro, a wolf-god in the Studio Ghibli animated film Princess Mononoke
 Moro, a cultivar of the blood orange
Moro, a character in Dragon Ball Super series
Moro, a character in 1988 Soviet film The Needle played by Viktor Tsoi

See also 
 Moor (disambiguation)
 Moros y cristianos (disambiguation)

Language and nationality disambiguation pages